Vemuru (SC) Assembly constituency is a scheduled caste reserved constituency is a constituency in bapatla district of Andhra Pradesh, representing the state legislative assembly in India. As per the Delimitation Orders (2008), the constituency covers Vemuru, Kollur, Tsunduru, Bhattiprolu and Amarthaluru mandals. It is one of the seven assembly segments of Bapatla (SC) (Lok Sabha constituency), along with Repalle, Bapatla, Parchur, Addanki, Chirala and Santhanuthalapadu. Merugu Nagarjuna is the present MLA of the constituency, who won the 2019 Andhra Pradesh Legislative Assembly election from YSR Congress Party. As of 25 March 2019, there are a total of 194,748 electors in the constituency.

Mandals

Members of Legislative Assembly Vemuru

Election results

Assembly elections 2019

Assembly elections 2014

Assembly elections 2009

Assembly elections 2004

Assembly elections 1999

Assembly elections 1994

Assembly elections 1989

Assembly elections 1985

Assembly elections 1983

Assembly elections 1978

Assembly elections 1972

Assembly elections 1967

Assembly elections 1962

Assembly elections 1955

See also 
 List of constituencies of the Andhra Pradesh Legislative Assembly

References

Further reading 
 

Assembly constituencies of Andhra Pradesh